Ocean Terminal is a passenger terminal servicing cruise ships and a shopping centre, located on Canton Road in Tsim Sha Tsui, Kowloon, Hong Kong.

History
The location of Ocean Terminal was once a pier (Kowloon Star Ferry Pier, Kowloon Wharf and Godown) on the western shore of Tsim Sha Tsui. Rebuilt and enlarged for use as a cruise terminal, it also served as a multi-storey shopping centre. Ocean Terminal opened on 22 March 1966, signifying the increasing wealth of Hong Kong and costing HK$70 million. Its 112 shops made it "the largest shopping centre" in Hong Kong. It was the first shopping mall in Hong Kong.

In 1982, it was re-branded together with nearby buildings of the Wharf as Harbour City. Ocean Terminal is now owned by The Wharf (Holdings) Limited.

Heavy transport
The annual berth utilisation rate of Ocean Terminal in Tsim Sha Tsui, which offers two berths accommodating vessels of up to 50,000 tonnes, rose to 76% last year from 71% in 2003. Between 2001 and 2006, some 11 cruise vessels had to berth mid-stream and at container terminals because Ocean Terminal could not meet market demand.

Gallery

See also
 Star House

References

External links

Official website

Tsim Sha Tsui
Tourist attractions in Hong Kong
Landmarks in Hong Kong
Shopping centres in Hong Kong
The Wharf (Holdings)
Wharves
Piers in Hong Kong
1966 establishments in Hong Kong